The Catholic School is a 2021 Italian drama film directed by Stefano Mordini.

The film is an adaptation of the novel of the same name by Edoardo Albinati and is based on the 1975 Circeo massacre. It premiered out of competition at the 78th Venice Film Festival, and was released in Italy on 7 October 2021.

Cast

References

External links

2021 films
2020s Italian-language films
2021 drama films
Italian drama films
2020s Italian films
Films based on Italian novels
Films directed by Stefano Mordini
Films set in 1975